The 1973 24 Hours of Le Mans was the 41st Grand Prix of Endurance and took place on 9 and 10 June 1973.  It was the eighth round of the 1973 World Championship of Makes.

The race promised to be close, with Ferrari, Matra and Porsche all having two wins in the championship along with a surprise victory for Mirage at Spa. It did indeed turn out to be one of the most tense Le Mans, with the race won in the pits as both Ferrari and Matra took turns in the lead only to be stymied by mechanical failures. All three Ferraris had time in the lead, but as mechanical issues overtook them it was the Matra of Henri Pescarolo and Gérard Larrousse, despite its own tribulations, that took the chequered flag. In the end it was a comfortable six-lap margin over the second-placed Ferrari of Merzario and Pace with the Matra of Jabouille/Jaussaud third.

There was a certain symmetry for a French car and a French team winning the fiftieth anniversary of the first 24 Hours of Le Mans. Ferrari did win the GT category after a close tussle with Porsche, and BMW had the only finisher in the Group 2 Touring Car category.

Regulations
In the second year of the new regulations, there were no changes. This year the Automobile Club de l'Ouest (ACO) extended the eligible classes to eight with an extra one each in Group 5 and 2. Reserves were not kept, rather the ACO selected the 55 starters from those who arrived taking into account the results of the Four-Hour race at the Test Weekend.

1973 was the 50th anniversary of the first race and there was much pomp and celebration. Included in this were races for pre-war and post-war cars and the first parade of historic Le Mans competitors. The French Post Office issued a special commemorative stamp.

Entries
The ACO received 112 applications. Even though Autodelta, the Alfa Romeo works team withdrew just days before the event there were 61 cars present for practice on race-week. With Sports-prototypes from Matra, Ferrari, Mirage and Ligier as well as Ford and BMW in Group 2, there were 22 ‘works’ entries.

After a distinct lack of success, Matra withdrew from Formula One to concentrate on contesting the World Championship of Makes against Ferrari. Its new longtail MS670B was made lighter, more aerodynamic and, importantly, equipped with Porsche "Type 1983" gearboxes. The V12 engine was tuned back to put out 450 bhp. and the car now ran on 13” tyres instead of the former 15”.
Adding two cars to their regular Championship team made a strong 4-car challenge in an all-French driver line-up. Jean-Pierre Beltoise and François Cevert were constantly quickest but pushed their car hard, whereas Henri Pescarolo/Gérard Larrousse drove with endurance in mind, having got both of Matras victories to date. A third 670B was prepared for Jean-Pierre Jabouille/Jean-Pierre Jaussaud while Patrick Depailler/Bob Wollek had an older MS670.

After a dominant 1972 season, Ferrari was having a much tougher time this year, despite having come from the latest round with a 1–2 victory at the Nürburgring. With the championship carefully balanced, the works team arrived in force with proven reliability. The latest iteration of the 312PB was wider and longer to take bigger tyres and improve handling. The aerodynamic longtail chassis increased speed on Le Mans’ big straights while the improved V12 was now capable of 460 bhp in race-trim. The regular team driver pairings of Jacky Ickx/Brian Redman (who had both Ferrari victories this year) and Arturo Merzario/Carlos Pace were augmented by Carlos Reutemann/Tim Schenken.

After 1971 John Wyer had retired from racing. However, he had started plans for his own car-design and convinced Gulf Oil to back the project. Former Ford engineer Len Bailey designed the Mirage M6 based around the Cosworth DFV engine. However, the engine was renowned for vibration and being hard on components so a V12 engine was commissioned from Weslake for a new coupé. But continual unreliability meant the Weslake project was shelved and the team focused on improving the V8 spyder refitted with ZF gearboxes, buoyed by a 1-2 result at Spa. Their drivers were Derek Bell/Howden Ganley and Mike Hailwood/John Watson (nursing a broken leg)/Vern Schuppan.

Alfa Romeo was more affected than Ferrari by the strikes and social troubles in Italy. Autodelta, the Alfa works team, felt their new 500 bhp flat-12 powered car was still unprepared for 24 hours and did not enter. But they were represented by their customer team, Scuderia Brescia Corse, with a V8 T33/3.

Lola did return to Le Mans after a promising, but tragic, race the previous year. The Scuderia Filipinetti had taken over Jo Bonnier’s team after his death. Despite the Swiss team’s owner Georges Filipinetti dying in May from a heart attack, a car was entered for Jean-Louis Lafosse and Hughes de Fierlandt. An ex-Bonnier Lola was also run by former hill-climb champion Daniel Rouveyran.
Alain de Cadenet also returned to Le Mans after a strong run the previous year in his Duckhams-Cosworth, paired again with Chris Craft. The body was redesigned to be more aerodynamic although no high-speed testing had been able to be done. 
Ligier finally had the improved Citroen-Maserati V6 engine, now capable of 330 bhp and three cars were entered for the race, including one for Guy Ligier himself, with Jacques Laffite. Filling out the Group 5 field were four older Porsche 908s, including the regular entries from the Spanish Escuderia Montjuïch and Swiss André Wicky.

The 2-litre Group 5 class was well represented this year. The Chevron chassis was designed to accommodate a variety of engines and five were entered. Cosworth recommended an engine rebuild of their 2-litre FVC engine after only four hours of racing, so running 24 hours was problematic. They were up against a French ACE, a Lola and an old Porsche 910. Perhaps the most interesting entry was the first Japanese car to race at Le Mans, and with the first Japanese drivers. Shin Kato’s Sigma was powered by a Mazda Wankel twin-rotary engine. With a claimed performance of 260 bhp it was calculated as a 2292cc equivalent. Three were built for the Japanese series and one came to Le Mans.

Once again it was Ferrari versus Chevrolet in the GTS Group 4. The 365 GTB/4 “Daytona” now developed 440 bhp and nine were entered by the customer teams, many with works-prepared engines. Vic Elford was coaxed out of semi-retirement by the French Charles Pozzi team and there were four from the North American Racing Team (NART) including their young drivers’ Trofeo car (managed by Phil Hill). Four Corvettes were entered: the two French cars of Henri Greder and the Ecurie Léopard. John Greenwood arrived with two cars, one carrying a special alloy 7-litre engine boosted to put out 700 bhp.

Porsche came to Le Mans with its bigger, burlier version of the 911 to take on the big cars in Group 4. Before homologation was granted it had a surprise win at Sebring beating the Group 5, and followed it up in what was to be the final Targa Florio. The Carrera RS was lightened, with a big rear spoiler and flared wheel-arches to take wider 11” tyres. The engine had been bored out to 2.7-litres, and now produced 240 bhp. The RSR-variant had a bigger 2.8-litre engine good for 300 bhp. The Martini International team returned, led by David Yorke (former team manager at JW Automotive) and with works support, had two experimental versions capable of 320 bhp in the Sports category. Further lightened, they had 14” tyres and were driven by Gijs van Lennep/Herbert Müller and Reinhold Joest/Claude Haldi. Additionally, a squadron of eleven standard 911 GTs arrived for practice from privateer teams.

In Group 2, the European Touring Car Championship (ETCC) was again very popular with top drivers and close racing, and the mighty battle between the works teams of BMW and Ford spilled over into Le Mans. Ford Germany arrived with three 3-litre Capris for drivers Dieter Glemser/John Fitzpatrick, Gerry Birrell/Hans Heyer and Helmuth Koinigg/Jean Vinatier.
In response, BMW turned up with the 3.0 CSL run by its newly set up BMW Motorsport works team under Jochen Neerpasch (formerly at Ford). The car had a more powerful 360 bhp over the Capri's 300 bhp. Their drivers were Chris Amon/Hans-Joachim Stuck and Toine Hezemans/Dieter Quester with a third for the Wicky Racing Team.

Practice
At the March test weekend, Beltoise put in a time for the Matra four seconds faster than Ferrari had 12 months earlier. Ferrari, citing labour strikes in Italy, did not attend. But Merzario and Ickx immediately set the pace on Wednesday night when official practice started. The only other sub-3:40 time was from the Cevert/Beltoise Matra; in fact these two works teams filled the top seven spots on the grid. Next were the two Gulf Mirages and the Gitanes Lola in tenth. None of the teams had been trying too hard to compete for a top time.
The smaller teams had a far tougher time. Both the Duckhams and the Ligiers were suffering from unstable aerodynamics. The Duckhams was running over ten seconds slower than it had the previous year. In the small-engine class, the Spanish Chevron was 13th (4:11.0) just ahead of the Sigma rotary (4:11.1). The Porsche RSR prototypes were slower than their test weekend times, until van Lennep found performance improved with narrower rear tyres.  Müller recorded a 4:14.9 to be 18th on the grid.
Several incidents gave the mechanics all-nighter repair jobs: John Watson's Mirage spun in the Porsche curves and the rear section lifted and clouted him on the head; Lola had a tyre blowout rip up the rear bodywork and Ferrari got an urgent call from the factory saying the valve springs were set wrong needing 48 changes per engine.

It was close in the Group 2 and 4 categories with only three seconds covering the best Ferraris, Porsches, Fords and BMWs. Quickest was Glemser in the Ford Capri (4:16.0 for 22nd) ahead of Elford's Ferrari. The Corvettes were off the pace with Greenwood's being the best with a 4:19.6. His special-engine car was disqualified by the officials after Don Yenko had had an accident doing illegal road-testing on public roads after a full differential change. His daughter, also in the car, was taken to the hospital for stitches. The Kremer-Porsche caught fire when oil leaked onto the hot exhaust, necessitating a full engine-change, and Walter Brun put the Wicky-BMW into the Armco at the chicane.

Race

Start
Bright sunshine in race week became dark clouds on Saturday morning, however by 4pm it was sunny again. Honorary starter this year was Sylvain Floirat, President of Matra. From the first lap, Merzario was bolting ahead, sent out as the ‘hare’ to lead the Matras into a race – a role he relished. However none of the other teams took the bait. A number of cars were coming in immediately with problems: Reinhold Joest's Martini Porsche with gearbox problems and the Grossman Ferrari with a puncture. Hailwood's Mirage had no clutch and Amon's BMW on had fifth gear. The Gitanes Lola, the Duckhams and the Sigma also all had early issues.

By the pit stops around the end of the first hour, Merzario had built a significant lead but already needed to change brakepads. After the first driver changes, Carlos Pace only got six laps in the Ferrari until he had to stop, partly soaked in petrol from a split fuel tank, losing six laps. Matra was now 1-2-3 with Cevert leading from Larrousse and Wollek, chased by Reutemann in the Ferrari. While the Matras were all running at the same speed, the Ferraris had a variety of strategies. Carlos Reutemann and Tim Schenken were running among the Matras. Jacky Ickx and Brian Redman were running with the slowest 3-litre cars, the Lolas and the Alfa Romeo.

After four hours, Jaussaud's front tyre blew out while going down the Mulsanne Straight. Ten laps were lost repairing the suspension. Less than an hour later, Beltoise had almost the same thing happen, and his Matra lost eight laps. As the Pescarolo/Larrousse car had been delayed fixing its brakes the lead fell to the Wollek/Depailler Matra. Then at 9.30pm, their car was in the pits with a terminal oil-pump problem and suddenly the Matra challenge was looking very shaky. At the same time, the GT-leading Sam Posey’s NART Ferrari lost five minutes in a poor pitstop, allowing the Charles Pozzi car of Elford/Ballot-Léna to take the category lead. These cars were all having a close running battle with the Martini Porsche, the Spanish 908, the Maublanc Chevron 2-litre and the fastest Capri.

Night
So by 10pm after six hours, it was now the Schenken/Reutemann Ferrari leading from Pescarolo/Larrousse. Third was Ickx/Redman, hitherto run conservatively, ahead of the Hailwood/Watson/Schuppan Mirage, Merzario's Ferrari and the Brescia Alfa Romeo. Wollek's Matra was 7th and the Müller/van Lennep Porsche 8th. Then when Pescarolo was delayed again, this time by a faulty gear selector, Ferrari was running 1–2. Both Merzario and Cevert were pushing their cars hard to make up lost time and just before midnight, Cevert put in the fastest lap of the race.

Soon after midnight, Schuppan went wide at Tertre Rouge, hit the barrier and rolled his Mirage.  The Merzario/Pace Ferrari was back in the pits, this time for 40 minutes replacing a slipping clutch. The Elford/Ballot-Léna spent 11 minutes changing brakepads, allowing the NART Ferrari through to the GT-lead again. In Group 2, all three Fords had been badly as night fell. The Birrell/Heyer car was out early, and its drivers transferred to the other team cars. The Glemser/Fitzpatrick car had got as high as tenth with the Hezemans/Quester BMW close by in 12th. Both cars were delayed before midnight and spent the rest of the night working back through the field.

Then at 2.30am the leader was stopped out on the track by a broken conrod, and soon after Beltoise's Matra (now running 5th) again had a tyre blow out on it but this time it threw him into the guard-rails. So at half-time, Ickx was leading Pescarolo by two laps, while 8 laps further back Facetti in the surprising Alfa Romeo was ahead of Merzario and the Martini Porsche. After all the mechanical problems with the Group 5 cars, the NART Ferrari 365 was sixth leading the GTs, hounded by the Kremer and Sonauto Porsches and Elford's Ferrari. Ecuadorian Guillermo Ortega's privateer Porsche 908 rounded out the top-10.

Morning
Dawn came with mist and a light drizzle, but cleared to be another sunny day. But then after leading for seven hours, the lead Ferrari started sounding rough and just after 9am Redman brought it in with a split exhaust header. Coincidentally, a lap later Pescarolo also came in, with brake problems. It was the Matra that got back out into the lead just 15 seconds before the Ferrari. Mid-morning the third-placed Alfa Romeo's gearbox's broke. Seventy minutes were spent repairing it.

In the GT race, the NART Ferrari was running sixth and still held a narrow lead over the Kremer Porsche, made easier when the Porsche lost time in the early morning with a jammed brake calliper and detached exhaust. The Gregg/Chasseuil Sonauto Porsche was in 8th overall at 6am when a puncture on the Mulsanne Straight damaged the suspension dropping down the order. They were not alone, as most of the GT field had serious problems in the morning. In Group 2, it was resolved when the remaining Ford of Glemser/Fitzpatrick/Heyer got a broken conrod at 10.40am, leaving the BMW as the last Group 2 car running.

Then at 11am Minter bought the GT-leading Ferrari from 7th, smoking badly from a cracked piston. At the same time Ickx brought the pursuing Ferrari in with a split fuel cell like its sister-car had had earlier, costing 25 minutes and six laps to repair. But an hour later the Matra's starter motor failed in a regular pit-stop costing 20 minutes, and it was even once again.

Finish and post-race
Finally, with barely 90 minutes to go, the Ickx/Redman Ferrari was out – another conrod had broken and the car was wheeled away to a standing ovation from the crowd in the grandstand opposite.  After that Pescarolo and Larrousse were able to ease off and cruise to the finish. In the end they finished six laps ahead of the Merzario/Pace Ferrari. Eighteen laps further back (and still not overtaken Ickx's retired Ferrari on distance) was the recovering Matra of Jabouille/Jaussaud.

In a very close finish, the French Ferrari of Elford/Ballot-Léna was sixth, barely a lap ahead of the hard-charging Kremer Porsche, with Ortega's privateer Porsche 908 between them. Ninth was the other Pozzi Ferrari of Serpaggi/Dolhem with Georg Loos’ Porsche RSR in tenth. The Brescia Corse Alfa Romeo had had a troubled end to the race with gearbox, clutch then fuel-pump issues after a solid first half but eventually got home in 15th.

After the win at Le Mans, Matra stormed home in the Championship winning the next two rounds. The final round in Argentina was cancelled due to lack of support, giving Matra the championship with five victories (all to Pescarolo/Larrousse) to Ferrari's two.
In the European GT season it was Claude Ballot-Léna and Clemens Schickentanz, both driving Porsche RSRs who shared the championship on equal points. Toine Hezemans won the European Touring Car Championship for BMW.
Later in the summer, “Pesca” and Larrousse came back to Le Mans to be presented with the Legion d’Honneur, France's highest order of merit. Still to date, 1973 was the final time that both the Scuderia Ferrari works team and Alfa Romeo have raced at Le Mans.

Official results

Finishers
Results taken from Quentin Spurring's book, officially licensed by the ACO Class Winners are in Bold text.

Did Not Finish

Did Not Start

Class Winners

Note: setting a new class distance record.

Index of Thermal Efficiency
For Group 2 and Group 4 cars.

Note: Only the top ten positions are included in this set of standings.

Statistics
Taken from Quentin Spurring's book, officially licensed by the ACO
 Fastest Lap in practice –A.Merzario, #16 Ferrari 312 PB-73 – 3:37.5secs; 
 Fastest Lap – F. Cevert, #10 Matra-Simca MS670B – 3:39.6secs; 
 Winning Distance – 
 Winner's Average Speed – 
 Attendance –  ?

International Championship for Makes Standings
As calculated after Le Mans, Round 8 of 10

Note: Only the best 7 of 10 results counted to the final Championship points. The full total earned to date is given in brackets

Citations

References
 Armstrong, Douglas – English editor (1974)    Automobile Year #21 1973-74    Lausanne: Edita S.A.
 Clarke, R.M. - editor (1997)    Le Mans 'The Ford and Matra Years 1966-1974'    Cobham, Surrey: Brooklands Books  
 Clausager, Anders (1982)    Le Mans    London: Arthur Barker Ltd  
 Laban, Brian (2001)    Le Mans 24 Hours    London: Virgin Books   
 Moity, Christian (1974)    The Le Mans 24 Hour Race 1949-1973    Radnor, Pennsylvania: Chilton Book Co  
 Spurring, Quentin (2011)    Le Mans 1970-79    Yeovil, Somerset: Haynes Publishing  
 Wimpffen, János (2007)    Spyders and Silhouettes    Hong Kong: David Bull Publishing  
  24 heures du Mans 1973 in Automobile Historique n°49, June/July 2005

External links
 Racing Sports Cars – Le Mans 24 Hours 1973 entries, results, technical detail. Retrieved 25 Jun 2018
  Le Mans History – Le Mans History, hour-by-hour (incl. pictures, quotes, YouTube links). Retrieved 25 Jun 2018
  World Sports Racing Prototypes – results, reserve entries & chassis numbers. Retrieved 25 Jun 2018
  Team Dan – results & reserve entries, explaining driver listings. Retrieved 25 Jun 2018
  Unique Cars & Parts – results & reserve entries. Retrieved 25 Jun 2018
  Formula 2 – Le Mans results & reserve entries. Retrieved 25 Jun 2018
  Motorsport Memorial – details of the year's fatal accidents. Retrieved 25 Jun 2018
  YouTube – Colour amateur footage (no sound), in three parts (Pt 1 - 8mins).  Retrieved 6 Jul 2018
  YouTube – Colour amateur footage (no sound), in three parts (Pt 2 - 6mins).  Retrieved 6 Jul 2018
  YouTube – Colour amateur footage (no sound), in three parts (Pt 3 - 7mins).  Retrieved 6 Jul 2018
  YouTube – Colour amateur footage (no sound), of the vintage parade races (8mins).  Retrieved 6 Jul 2018
  YouTube – B/w French news report of race (1min).  Retrieved 6 Jul 2018

24 Hours of Le Mans races
Le Mans
1973 in French motorsport